The 1979 Avon Championships of Seattle  was a women's tennis tournament played on indoor carpet courts at the Seattle Center Arena  in Seattle, Washington in the United States that was part of the 1979 Avon Championships Circuit. It was the third edition of the tournament and was held from February 6 through February 11, 1979. First-seeded Chris Evert won the singles title and earned $24,000 first-prize money.

Finals

Singles
 Chris Evert defeated  Renée Richards 6–1, 3–6, 6–1
 It was Evert's 1st singles title of the year and the 86th of her career.

Doubles
 Françoise Dürr /  Betty Stöve defeated  Sue Barker /  Ann Kiyomura 7–6, 4–6, 6–4

Prize money

References

External links
 International Tennis Federation (ITF) tournament edition details

Avon Championships of Seattle
Virginia Slims of Seattle
Virginia Slims of Seattle
Virginia Slims of Seattle
Tennis in Washington (state)